Agdistis ingens is a moth in the family Pterophoridae. It is known from southern Russia, China (Gansu), Mongolia, Tadzhikistan, Kirghistan, Kazakhstan, Uzbekistan, Turkmenistan and Afghanistan.

The wingspan is 32–35 mm.

References

Agdistinae
Moths described in 1887